David Zink Yi is a contemporary artist working primarily in video, photography, and sculpture.

He has said: "body is the space and the medium in which the process of questioning of identity takes place".

References

Living people
Year of birth missing (living people)